Mukhtar Beskenuly Tileuberdi (Mūhtar Beskenūly Tıleuberdı, ; born June 30, 1968) is a Kazakh statesman who was appointed the post of Minister of Foreign Affairs of the Republic of Kazakhstan on 18 September 2019. He also serves as Deputy Prime Minister of Kazakhstan in the Älihan Smaiylov.

Early life and education
Tileuberdi was born June 30, 1968, in the village of Aksu, Chimkent region. He graduated from Kirov Kazakh State University (Al-Farabi Kazakh National University) majoring in philosophy. After graduating from the university, he started working at the departments of History of Philosophy and Chinese Philology of the Al-Farabi Kazakh State University.

Career

Tileuberdi was appointed as the Minister of Foreign Affairs on 18 September 2019. Prior to that, he had served as First Vice Minister of foreign affairs of Kazakhstan from 2016 to 2019. 

Tileuberdi has an extensive diplomatic career. He served as Kazakhstan Ambassador to Malaysia with concurrent accreditation to Indonesia, Brunei, and the Philippines. He also served as Ambassador of Kazakhstan to the Switzerland and with concurrent accreditation to Liechtenstein and the Vatican. Additionally, he served as the Permanent Representative of Kazakhstan to the United Nations Office and other international organizations in Geneva.

During his tenure as Foreign Minister, Tileuberdi pays great attention to supporting foreign investors interested in the Kazakh market and Kazakh businesses abroad. In one of his op-eds Tileuberdi emphasized that the Foreign Ministry was at the forefront of economic diplomacy aimed at promoting Kazakhstan as an investment destination.

Tileuberdi is active in the advocacy of interethnic and interfaith tolerance.

Awards 

 Order of Parasat (2020)

References

1968 births
Living people
Foreign ministers of Kazakhstan
Deputy Prime Ministers of Kazakhstan